The Turkish March, Op. 55 is a composition by Russian composer Mikhail Ippolitov-Ivanov, which was published in 1932 in Moscow.

Composition 
This symphonic march lasts approximately five minutes. It is a very conventional work by Ippolitov-Ivanov, and therefore, all harmonies and rhythms are conventional. He wrote this composition as a part of his own research for Turkish, Uzbek and Kazakh folk music in its later years, and two years after composing his Turkish Fragments, which, indeed, recreate the same atmosphere with Turkish melodies and rhythms. He died three years afterwards, and this march is one of his last works.

Notable recordings 

Notable recordings of this march include:

References 

Compositions by Mikhail Ippolitov-Ivanov
Compositions for symphony orchestra
1932 compositions